is a passenger railway station in the city of  Hitachiōta, Ibaraki Prefecture, operated by East Japan Railway Company (JR East).

Lines
Hitachi-Ōta Station is a terminus of the Hitachi-Ōta Branch Line of the Suigun Line, and is 9.5 kilometres from the start of the branch line at Kami-Sugaya Station.

Station layout
The station consists of a single dead-headed side platform. The station has a Midori no Madoguchi ticket office.

History
The Ota Railway merged with the Mito Railway on October 21, 1901 and was nationalized on December 1, 1927, and the station was renamed to its present name at that time. The station was absorbed into the JR East network upon the privatization of the Japanese National Railways (JNR) on April 1, 1987. A new station building was completed in April 2011.

Passenger statistics
In fiscal 2019, the station was used by an average of 1153 passengers daily (boarding passengers only).

Bus routes
Ibaraki Kotsu
For Satokawa-iriguchi

Surrounding area

 Hitachiōta Post Office

See also
List of railway stations in Japan

References

External links

 JR East Station information 

Railway stations in Ibaraki Prefecture
Suigun Line
Railway stations in Japan opened in 1899
 Hitachiōta, Ibaraki